Planfließ is a river of Brandenburg, Germany. It flows into the Großer Treppelsee, which is drained by the Schlaube, near Bremsdorf.

See also
List of rivers of Brandenburg

Rivers of Brandenburg
Rivers of Germany